Rivers Casino is a casino in Des Plaines, Illinois, United States, a northern suburb of Chicago. It is minutes away from O'Hare International Airport. Rivers Casino opened on July 18, 2011. It is majority-owned by Churchill Downs Inc., and managed by its minority owner, Rush Street Gaming.

The building sits above a few inches of water in a shallow pit.  This was created for the casino to comply with state law, intended to legalize riverboat gambling.

History
In 2008, the Illinois Gaming Board awarded the state's 10th and last casino license to Midwest Gaming and Entertainment LLC, a group led by Neil Bluhm, to build a  casino on approximately  adjacent to the Tri-State Tollway at the northwest corner of Devon Avenue and Des Plaines River Road. Des Plaines was awarded the gaming license in 2008. The city approved zoning in early 2010. The casino opened in July 2011 as Rivers Casino.

In 2019, Churchill Downs Inc., which owned the nearby Arlington Park racetrack, purchased a 62 percent stake in the casino from Bluhm and his partners for $407 million.

References

External links
 Official website

Des Plaines, Illinois
Casinos completed in 2011
Casinos in Illinois
Churchill Downs Incorporated